Pitchfork is a 2016 horror film and the directorial debut of Glenn Douglas Packard. It premiered on September 23, 2016 at the Hot Springs Horror Film Festival, where it won "Best First Time Filmmaker Horror". By September 20, 2016, it was announced in Deadline Hollywood that Uncork’d Entertainment had acquired the film and it would have a limited theatrical release on January 6, 2017 and would be released on VOD January 13 of the same year.

Synopsis

Hunter and friends travel back to his family farm in rural Michigan after sharing a deep secret with his conservative family.
A festive night turns into horror as one by one they are all stalked by a deranged killer wielding a pitchfork.

Cast
Daniel Wilkinson as Ben Holister Jr. / Pitchfork
Brian Raetz as Hunter Killian
Lindsey Nicole as Clare
Ryan Moore as Matt
Celina Beach as Lenox
Nicole Dambro as Flo
Keith Webb as Rocky
Sheila Leason as Janelle
Vibhu K Raghave as Gordon
Rachel Carter as Judy Holister / Ma
Andrew Dawe-Collins as Ben Holister Sr. / Pa
Derek Reynolds as Wayne Killian
Carol Ludwick as Ruth Killian
Addisyn Wallace as Jenny Killian
Anisbel Lopez as Trisha

Reception

Pitchfork reviews have been mixed and the movie currently has a rating of 20% on Rotten Tomatoes with an average rating of 2/10, based on 5 reviews. The Hollywood Reporter and Los Angeles Times both criticised the film, which the Los Angeles Times felt was "tediously routine." Horror website Bloody Disgusting was more favorable, stating that "there is still some fun to be had with Pitchfork. The classic slasher formula works for a reason, and the movie does have some of that low-budget charm that’s so illusive in this age of digital film." Another horror website, Heaven of Horror, gave it a 3/5 rating and called it "a hardcore horror movie with a few campy elements and some truly awesome moments".

References

External links
 

2016 films
2016 horror films
American slasher films
Films set in Michigan
Gay-related films
LGBT-related horror films
2016 directorial debut films
2016 LGBT-related films
2010s English-language films
2010s American films